Zawadka may refer to the following places in Poland:
Zawadka, Lower Silesian Voivodeship (south-west Poland)
Zawadka, Lublin Voivodeship (east Poland)
Zawadka, Limanowa County in Lesser Poland Voivodeship (south Poland)
Zawadka, Miechów County in Lesser Poland Voivodeship (south Poland)
Zawadka, Nowy Sącz County in Lesser Poland Voivodeship (south Poland)
Zawadka, Wadowice County in Lesser Poland Voivodeship (south Poland)
Zawadka, Strzyżów County in Subcarpathian Voivodeship (south-east Poland)
Zawadka, Bieszczady County in Subcarpathian Voivodeship (south-east Poland)
Zawadka, Myślenice County in Lesser Poland Voivodeship (south Poland)
Zawadka, Gmina Koło in Greater Poland Voivodeship (west-central Poland)
Zawadka, Gmina Olszówka in Greater Poland Voivodeship (west-central Poland)
Zawadka, Silesian Voivodeship (south Poland)
Zawadka, Pomeranian Voivodeship (north Poland)

Zavadka, Skole Raion, a village in Lviv Oblast, Western Ukraine